Evanston  is a small community in the Canadian province of Nova Scotia, located in Richmond, Subd. A in Richmond County on Cape Breton Island .

Climate
This climatic region is typified by large seasonal temperature differences, with warm to hot (and often humid) summers and cold (sometimes severely cold) winters.  According to the Köppen Climate Classification system, Evanston, Nova Scotia has a humid continental climate, abbreviated "Dfb" on climate maps.

References

Evanston  on Destination Nova Scotia

Communities in Richmond County, Nova Scotia